Yusefabad (also Romanized as Yūsefābād, Yusafabad, and Yūsofābād) is a village in Soltaniyeh Rural District, Soltaniyeh District, Abhar County, Zanjan Province, Iran. At the 2006 census, its population was 1,102, in 290 families.

References 

Populated places in Abhar County